Gregory Lucas Malek-Jones (born May 12, 1990) known professionally as Gregori Lukas is an American recording artist, singer, dancer and actor.  Gregori released his debut single "Stay", in March 2013, to rave reviews. He has appeared with the New York City Ballet in numerous productions and is best known for playing the title role in George Balanchine's Nutcracker at the New York State Theater in Lincoln Center.

Life and career 
Born and raised in Montclair, New Jersey, Malek-Jones attended the Professional Performing Arts School in New York City alongside Taylor Momsen and Sarah Hyland, where he studied musical theater and dance. While in attendance at the Professional Performing Arts School, he was nominated for the New Jersey Theater Alliance's NJACT Perry Award for Best Male Ensemble actor in a musical for his role in the Montclair Operetta Club's Children of Eden. Gregori also attended the School of American Ballet in Lincoln Center from the years 2001–2007. During his term with the School of American Ballet he performed in various shows with the New York City Ballet, including Harlequinade, Swan Lake, Vienna Waltzes, Sleeping Beauty and George Balanchine The Nutcracker. While in production with George Balanchine The Nutcracker, he was featured in the film, The Nutcracker Family : Behind the Magic, directed by Virginia Loring Brooks. Malek-Jones also starred in the film adaptation for the independent film Tap Dreams, directed by Anthony Giordano. Malek-Jones appeared with the Paper Mill Playhouse in various theater productions such as The King And I and Carousel. He also sang alongside Tony Award winner Ben Vereen for the New Voices concert in April 2003. In 2005, Malek-Jones appeared with New York City's Camp Broadway with "Melissa & Joey" star Joey Lawrence in the Macy's Thanksgiving Day Parade singing "Ac-Cent-Tchu-Ate the Positive". In February 2010, Gregory and his longtime friend formed the pop music group Closet Boys and digitally released their debut single, "I Wanna Go", worldwide under The Island Def Jam Music Group. Gregory now resides in Upper Montclair, New Jersey and New York City.

Discography

Singles 
 "Stay" (2013)
 "Belong" (2015)

Filmography

References

External links 
 
http://www.nytimes.com/2003/12/01/arts/city-ballet-review-come-on-valiant-toys-let-s-fight-evil-mice.html
http://www.villagevoice.com/2003-12-09/dance/upcoming/1/ 
http://danceviewtimes.com/dvny/reviews/2003/nycbnuts.htm
https://web.archive.org/web/20110714185525/http://www.njtheater.com/perry/perry2003.asp
http://www.mandy.com/1/film3.cfm?id=4425 
http://www.papermill.org/press-releases/current-season/199-paper-mill-playhouse-announces-the-cast-of-qcurtainsq-april-27-may-22-.html 
http://makeadifferencexp8.blogspot.com/2013/01/lukas-very-talented-young-musician-has.html
http://www.worldcat.org/title/nutcracker-family-behind-the-magic/oclc/182581948#details-allauthors
https://web.archive.org/web/20150905230513/http://www.newtownbee.com/news/news/2014/05/10/recording-artist-coming-play-and-stay-year-s-relay/205727

1990 births
Living people
American male singer-songwriters
American male pop singers
American singer-songwriters
American male ballet dancers
American LGBT musicians
American LGBT rights activists
People from Montclair, New Jersey
21st-century American singers
21st-century American male singers